Miscellaneous left (DVG) in France refers to left-wing candidates who are not members of any party or a member of party that has no elected seats. They include either small left-wing parties or dissidents expelled from their parties for running against their party's candidate. Numerous  candidates are elected at a local level, and a smaller number at the national level.

See also
Miscellaneous centre
Miscellaneous right

References

Left-wing parties in France
Political parties of the French Fifth Republic
Independent politicians in France